This is a list of cities in the Americas (South, Central and North) by founding year and present-day country.

See also
 European colonization of the Americas
 List of oldest continuously inhabited cities

References

External links
Gary S. Breschini, Ph.D. "The Founding of Monterey", The Monterey County Historical Society, 1996. Accessed June 15, 2007.
Kent Seavey. "A Short History of Salinas, California", The Monterey County Historical Society, 2006. Accessed June 15, 2007.

cities by year of foundation
Cities
North American cities by year of foundation
North American cities by year of foundation
North American cities by year of foundation